Fakala  is a Rural Commune of the Cercle of Djenné in the Mopti Region of Mali. The commune contains 30 villages and had a population of 32,689 in the census of 2009. The local government is based in the small town of Sofara.

References

External links
.

Communes of Mopti Region